"If I Go" is a song by English singer Ella Eyre. It was released on 10 July 2014 as the lead single from her debut studio album Feline. It is her debut solo single, after featuring on "Waiting All Night" by Rudimental and "Think About It" by Naughty Boy. The song has charted at number 16 on the UK Singles Chart. It has also charted at number 80 on the Irish Singles Chart.

Music video
A music video was released on May 30, 2014. It contains people walking three dimensionally around a purpose-built giant rotating box.

Track listing

Charts

Certifications

Cover versions
 Australian Judah Kelly covered the song on his debut album, Count On Me (2017).

Release history

References

2014 singles
2014 songs
Songs written by Jarrad Rogers
Virgin EMI Records singles
Songs written by Ella Eyre
Ella Eyre songs